Garage house (originally known as "garage"; local terms include "New York house" and New Jersey sound) is a dance music style that was developed alongside Chicago house music. The genre was popular in the 1980s in the United States and the 1990s in the United Kingdom, where it developed into UK garage and speed garage.

Characteristics
In comparison to other forms of house music, garage includes more gospel-influenced piano riffs and female vocals. It has a more soulful R&B-derived sound than Chicago house.

History

Garage house was developed in the Paradise Garage nightclub in New York City and Club Zanzibar in Newark, New Jersey, United States, during the early-to-mid 1980s.  There was much overlap between it and early house music, making it difficult to tell the two apart. It predates the development of Chicago house, and according to All Music, is relatively closer to disco than other dance styles. As Chicago house gained international popularity, New York's garage music scene was distinguished from the "house" umbrella.

Dance music of the 1980s made use of electronic instruments such as synthesizers, sequencers and drum machines. These instruments are an essential part of garage music. The direction of garage music was primarily influenced by the New York City discothèque Paradise Garage where the influential DJ Larry Levan, known for his musical versatility and innovation, played records.

According to Blues & Soul, contemporary garage music started with Boyd Jarvis and Levan's The Peech Boys. Jarvis, using the Visual moniker, was behind 1983 recordings "Somehow, Someway"  and "The Music Got Me" , the latter especially influential, which later was sampled by mainstream house music record producers Robert Clivillés and David Cole of C+C Music Factory.

The popularity of the genre in the UK gave birth to a derivative genre called UK garage.

See also
New Jersey sound

References

American styles of music
1980s in American music
1990s in American music
20th-century music genres
Culture of New York City
Culture of Newark, New Jersey
House music genres